Norrskedika is a locality situated in Östhammar Municipality, Uppsala County, Sweden with 214 inhabitants in 2010.

References 

Populated places in Uppsala County
Populated places in Östhammar Municipality